is a Japanese actor who was affiliated with K Dash, until he moved to RubyParade on April 4. 2017. He played the role of Takaharu Igasaki (Akaninger), the main character of the 2015 Super Sentai TV series Shuriken Sentai Ninninger.

Biography
Nishikawa plays a number of sports especially baseball. He entered the 26th Junon Super Boy Contest Quasi Grand Prix. Nishikawa first television role was in the 39th Super Sentai series, Shuriken Sentai Ninninger.

Filmography

TV series
2015 - 2016: Shuriken Sentai Ninninger - Igasaki Takaharu / Akaninger 

2019: Super Sentai Strongest Battle - Takaharu Igasaki / Akaninger  

2020:  The Reason  Why  He fell in love with me - Ryo takase

Films
2015: Ressha Sentai ToQger vs. Kyoryuger: The Movie - Akaninger ( voice) 

2015: Super Hero Taisen GP: Kamen Rider 3 - Takaharu Igasaki   / Akaninger 

2015:  Shuriken Sentai Ninninger the Movie: The Dinosaur Lord's Splendid Ninja Scroll! - Takaharu Igasaki /  Akaninger 

2015:  Shuriken sentai ninninger : Akaninger vs . starninger  hundred  nin battle - Takaharu Igasaki / Akaninger 

2016: Shuriken Sentai Ninninger vs. ToQger the Movie: Ninja in Wonderland -  Takaharu Igasaki /  Akaninger 

2016: Come Back! Shuriken Sentai Ninninger: Ninnin Girls vs. Boys FINAL WARS - Takaharu Igasaki  / Akaninger 

2016: AKB Love Night: Koi Kojo - Tomoki Hirose  

2017:   High & Low the movie 3 / Final Mission -  Tomoki Hirose 

2017: Doubutsu Sentai Zyuohger vs. Ninninger the Movie: Super Sentai's Message from the Future - Takaharu Igasaki / Akaninger  

2017: High & Low  the movie 2 / End of sky - Tomoki Hirose 

2018:  DTC : Yukemuri Junjo Hen from High & Low - Lassie  

2018:    Love in parallel - Paprika  

2018:  Lock -  On Love -  Haku  

2019:  Black Ctow 1 - Kazuki

References

External links
 Official profile at K Dash 
  

21st-century Japanese male actors
1994 births
Living people
People from Gunma Prefecture